William Charles Whitlock (Southampton, 20 June 1918 – 2 November 2001, Leicester) was a British Labour Party politician.

Whitlock was educated at Itchen Grammar School and the University of Southampton. He volunteered for the British Army upon graduation, and soon joined the Hampshires.  Part of the British Expeditionary Force, he was one of those evacuated on the last day at Dunkirk, escaping aboard a fishing trawler. At the end of 1940, he volunteered for the Airborne forces. Assigned to the British 1st Airborne Division, he landed near Nijmegen during Operation Market Garden and was one of the relatively few British airborne troops to escape death or capture during the operation. An excellent linguist, he remained in the Army for an extra year, acting as a German translator during the occupation.

He was appointed as an area organiser of the Union of Shop, Distributive and Allied Workers in 1946. In 1957, he became President of the Leicester City Labour Party.

Whitlock was elected as the Member of Parliament (MP) for Nottingham North in 1959. Throughout his career, he was a champion of improved conditions for office workers. A party whip from 1962, Whitlock was appointed Vice-Chamberlain of the Household in 1964, and retained the office until 1966. He was then briefly a Lord Commissioner of the Treasury before being appointed Comptroller of the Household. In 1967, he was again briefly a Commissioner of the Treasury before being appointed Under-Secretary of State for Commonwealth Relations. At that office, he was responsible for African affairs, and he advocated the admission of Asians expelled from Uganda into Britain. At the merger of the Foreign Office and Commonwealth Relations in 1968, he became Parliamentary Under-Secretary of State for Foreign and Commonwealth Affairs. Sent in 1969 to negotiate with the fledgling government of Anguilla, then seceding from Saint Kitts and Nevis, he was unceremoniously expelled from the country at gunpoint. The incident ended his ministerial career.

In 1983, he unexpectedly lost his seat to the Conservative Party candidate Richard Ottaway as part of Labour's national landslide defeat that year. The margin of defeat of 362 votes (0.8%) was less than the 1,184 votes gained by the Communist candidate John Peck.

Notes

Sources
Times Guide to the House of Commons, 1966 and 1983
The Almanac of British Politics 1999

External links 
 

1918 births
2001 deaths
Military personnel from Southampton
Royal Hampshire Regiment soldiers
British Army personnel of World War II
Labour Party (UK) MPs for English constituencies
UK MPs 1959–1964
UK MPs 1964–1966
UK MPs 1966–1970
UK MPs 1970–1974
UK MPs 1974
UK MPs 1974–1979
UK MPs 1979–1983
Alumni of the University of Southampton
Ministers in the Wilson governments, 1964–1970